Crocomela rubriplaga is a moth of the subfamily Arctiinae. It was described by Warren in 1904. It is found in Ecuador.

References

Arctiinae
Moths described in 1904